The Union for Democracy and National Solidarity is an oppositional political party in Benin.

The party's president, Sacca Lafia, was its candidate in the March 2001 presidential election, receiving 1.20% of the vote and fifth place. It  was part of the Star Alliance which contested the 1999 and 2003 parliamentary elections. At the Beninese parliamentary election, 2003, the Star Alliance won 3 out of 83 seats.

References

Political parties in Benin
Political parties with year of establishment missing